Thoracic vein may refer to:

 Internal thoracic vein
 Lateral thoracic vein